Cebu International School (CIS), was founded as the Cebu American School in 1924, and renamed in 1973. It is a co-educational day school, non-profit, non-sectarian institution, governed by a ten-member Board of Trustees. The current legal status of the school is defined in Republic Act No. 9190 (2003). English is the language of instruction at CIS.

From its original location in a villa in Gorordo Avenue, Cebu, the school moved to Banilad, (opposite Cebu Country Club), and then, in 2000, relocated to the present purpose-built campus the northern suburb of Pit-os, Cebu City.

Cebu International School is an authorized IB World School, offering the International Baccalaureate Diploma Programme (IB DP) from 1999, the IB Primary Years Programme (PYP) from January 2014, and the IB Middle Years Programme (MYP) from 2020.

In the 2007–2008 school year, CIS attained full international accreditation status through the Council of International Schools (CIS), and the Western Association of Schools and Colleges (WASC). CIS is also a full member of the East Asia Regional Council of Overseas Schools (EARCOS).

Cebu International School hosted a joint re-accreditation/re-authorization visit by CIS, WASC and the IB in September 2017.

References

External links

International Baccalaureate Organisation
Council of International Schools
Accrediting Commission for Schools Western Association of Schools and Colleges
East Asia Regional Council of Overseas Schools

East Asia Regional Council of Overseas Schools
International schools in the Philippines
International Baccalaureate schools in the Philippines
Schools in Cebu City
Educational institutions established in 1924
1924 establishments in the Philippines